Popular Photography, formerly known as Popular Photography & Imaging, also called Pop Photo, is a monthly American consumer website and former magazine that at one time had the largest circulation of any imaging magazine, with an editorial staff twice the size of its nearest competitor. Although the magazine ceased publication in early 2017, PopPhoto had a soft relaunch as a web-only publication the following year, and an official relaunch in December 2021.

History
The first issue of Popular Photography was published in 1937. It was based in New York City and owned by a number of companies during its lifetime, including Ziff Davis. It was sold by Hachette Filipacchi Media U.S. to Bonnier Corporation in 2009. The magazine's last publisher was Steven B. Grune and its last editor-in-chief was Miriam Leuchter.

One of its most well-known editors was American photographer and writer Norman Rothschild, whom Edward Steichen once called "the man who makes rainbows."

In early March 2017, the magazine folded, owing to declining advertising revenues from the consumer-camera industry. The March/April 2017 issue was its last. In May 2017, Bonnier was offering to fulfill PopPhoto subscriptions by sending other magazines.

PopPhoto soft-relaunched as an online-only publication in June 2018, and officially relaunched in December 2021.

See also 
 Modern Photography

References

Visual arts magazines published in the United States
Monthly magazines published in the United States
Bonnier Group
Consumer magazines
Defunct magazines published in the United States
Magazines established in 1937
Magazines disestablished in 2017
Magazines published in New York City
Photography in the United States
Photography magazines